Run (referred to on-screen as Run.) is a 2020 American psychological horror thriller film directed by Aneesh Chaganty and written by Chaganty and Sev Ohanian. The film stars Kiera Allen as Chloe Sherman, a disabled homeschooled teenager who begins to suspect that her mother Diane (Sarah Paulson) is keeping a dark secret about her upbringing.

Announced in June 2018, with Paulson being cast that October and Allen that December. Principal photography also occurred in that time frame, with filming primarily taking place on location in Winnipeg, Manitoba. The film has connections to other films by Chaganty and Ohanian, including Missing (2023).

Run was released in the United States via streaming on November 20, 2020 on Hulu, and was released in other territories both theatrically and through streaming by Lionsgate International and by Netflix on April 2, 2021. The film received generally positive reviews from critics and became Hulu's most successful original film upon its release.

Plot
Diane Sherman gives birth prematurely to a daughter, whom she goes to see lying in an incubator surrounded by hospital staff. Seventeen years later, Diane lives a quiet life with her now-teenage daughter, Chloe. Due to the circumstances of her birth, Chloe suffers from arrhythmia, hemochromatosis, asthma and diabetes, as well as partial paralysis. She uses a wheelchair, takes multiple medications daily, and is homeschooled by her mother.

One morning while looking through a bag of groceries for chocolate, Chloe finds a prescription bottle of green pills with Diane's name on the label. However, when Chloe later inspects the bottle, she finds a label bearing her name has been pasted over the original. Chloe tries to look up the name of the pills - Trigoxin - but discovers the house has no internet connection; Diane is seen sitting in the dark behind her next to an unplugged router. The next day, Chloe dials a random number from her mother's bedroom phone, and asks the answering stranger to look up the drug. He tells her it is a heart medication and that all pictures of the medication show a small red pill.

Chloe asks Diane to take her to the movies. During the film, while pretending to go to the bathroom, she rushes to the pharmacy across the street. The pharmacist reveals the green pills are a relaxant called Ridocaine, which is only approved for dogs. When Chloe asks what would happen if a human took the medication, the pharmacist informs her that it could numb one's legs. Upon realizing her mother may be administering medication to her to impair her ability to walk, Chloe begins to hyperventilate. Diane runs in and secretly sedates her daughter to take her home.

Chloe wakes up in bed and finds her bedroom door locked while Diane is out running an errand. Realizing that she has the house to herself, Chloe breaks out of her room by dragging herself onto the roof, eventually making her way to her mother's bedroom and breaking the window with a soldering iron and some water. She begins to have an asthma attack and only barely manages to crawl to her room and retrieve her inhaler. She tries to use her automated wheelchair ramp to go downstairs, but finds that Diane has cut the power cord. Chloe is forced to throw her wheelchair down the stairs and accidentally falls, sustaining minor injuries but also discovering that she can move one of her toes due to having not taken the Ridocaine in a few days.

Outside down the road, Chloe sees a mail truck and rushes to stop it; she explains her situation to Tom, the postal worker, who agrees to help. Diane pulls up and Chloe asks him to contact the police. Tom confronts Diane and tells her she can't take Chloe home. When closing up the van to take Chloe to the police station, Diane appears and stabs him with a sedative syringe. Chloe blacks out, and when she awakes, she is in the basement of her house, with her wheelchair chained to a steel pole.

While in the basement, Chloe discovers all of her childhood photos, which show her walking, as well as a death certificate for a girl named Chloe who died two hours after her birth and an article about a couple who had their baby stolen from the same hospital. When Diane enters, Chloe accuses her of deliberately making her sick and demands the truth. Diane insists everything she ever did was to help and protect Chloe and when Chloe accuses Diane of poisoning her, Diane exclaims that she saved her, while filling a syringe with paint thinner, saying it will make her forget. Chloe crawls away and locks herself in a closet. Afraid, but realizing that Diane won't let her die, Chloe swallows the contents of a bottle of organophosphate, forcing Diane to rush her to a hospital.

Chloe wakes up in a hospital bed, intubated and barely able to move. Diane insists that her "daughter" be discharged, but the doctors refuse until Chloe has been evaluated by a mental health professional. Chloe signals to a nurse, who brings her a crayon and paper. While Chloe is attempting to write "MOM" on the paper, a code blue is called and the nurse rushes out. Diane then sneaks in and ties Chloe to a wheelchair to escape; the nurse finds the bed empty and alerts hospital security. As a panicking Diane tries to find an exit, Chloe is able to move her foot and hold the chair in place. Diane begs her to come home with her, but Chloe defiantly replies that she doesn't need her any longer. Diane is shot in the arm by security guards, causing her to fall down the stairs.

Seven years later, an adult Chloe goes to a correctional facility; although she still relies on her wheelchair, she is now able to walk short distances with the use of a cane. She visits Diane in the infirmary ward, who is now confined to a bed, and begins talking about her wonderful husband, children, and job. Chloe takes out three plastic-wrapped Ridocaine pills she hid under her tongue, and tells Diane that she still loves her before asking her to open her mouth wide.

Cast
 Sarah Paulson as Diane Sherman
 Kiera Allen as Chloe Sherman
 Pat Healy as Mailman Tom
 Sara Sohn as Nurse Kammy
 Sharon Bajer as Kathy Bates, an homage to the actress of the same name.
 Tony Revolori as Brooklyn Boy (voice)

Production
In June 2018, it was announced Lionsgate would produce, distribute, and finance the film, with Aneesh Chaganty directing, from a screenplay he wrote alongside Sev Ohanian. Ohanian and Natalie Qasabian produced the film. In October 2018, Sarah Paulson joined the cast of the film, and in December 2018, Kiera Allen was set to star as well.

Principal photography in Winnipeg, Canada began on October 31, 2018, and wrapped on December 18, 2018.

Torin Borrowdale composed the film's score, as he previously collaborated with Chaganty in Searching. According to Borrowdale, the goal for the film's musical direction was to achieve "the essence of Bernard Herrmann, but for a 2020 cinematic experience." The film was a joint production between Summit Entertainment, Lions Gate Films, Search Party Productions, and Hulu Original Films.

Release
Run was originally scheduled to be theatrically released on May 8, 2020, coinciding with Mother's Day weekend, although as a result of the COVID-19 pandemic, its release was delayed indefinitely. Lionsgate intended to announce a new release date "once there is more clarity on when movie theaters" will reopen. 

In August 2020 however, with the pandemic's continued influence on the film industry, Hulu acquired American distribution rights to the film, and it debuted exclusively through them via streaming on November 20, 2020. The movie was released in other continents under Lionsgate International banner.

Netflix later acquired international streaming rights and released the film on April 2, 2021.

Reception

Audience viewership
Following its debut weekend, Hulu reported that Run was the most-watched original film in the platform's history, as well as the most talked about on Twitter.

Critical response
The site's critics consensus reads, "Solid acting and expertly ratcheted tension help Run transcend its familiar trappings to deliver a delightfully suspenseful thriller." On Metacritic, it has a weighted average score of 67 out of 100, based on 20 critics, indicating "generally favorable reviews."

Jessica Gomez of AllHorror.com wrote, "If you're like me and you were captivated by the story of Gypsy Rose and her mother Dee Dee Blanchard, then I've got a psychological thriller with your name on it." Ryan Lattanzio of IndieWire gave the film a "C+" and said, "There's enough go-for-broke and whiplash-inducing shifts in tone on display to suggest this filmmaking duo has a future, even when their characters don't seem to have a past."

Rahul Desai of Film Companion wrote, "The film doubles up as an allegory and indictment of modern parenting – the control disguised as caregiving, the lack of identity, the incessant smothering, the manipulation, and the blurred line between selflessness and selfishness"

Related films

Searching (2018)

In November 2018, Ohanian revealed that Run includes intentional references to his previous film Searching, while also stating that the latter has connections to the prior as well. Later in November 2020, Chaganty and Ohanian revealed that one of these connections involves a brief appearance by the character of Hannah from Searching as a stock photo model. The filmmaking duo stated that the references between their movies establish that they take place within the same fictional continuity.

Missing (2023)

In November 2022, Ohanian revealed that during the events of Missing, connections to Run. will be explored, including revealing what happened to its main characters. The filmmaker referred to the plot-thread as an epilogue to cliffhanger ending.

See also 
 Munchausen syndrome by proxy
 Gypsy Rose case

References

External links
 

2020 films
2020 psychological thriller films
2020s teen films
American psychological horror films
American horror thriller films
American psychological thriller films
American teen films
Films about child abuse
Films about child abduction in the United States
Films about dysfunctional families
Films postponed due to the COVID-19 pandemic
Films set in Seattle
Films shot in Winnipeg
Hulu original films
Lionsgate films
Films about mother–daughter relationships
Poisoning in film
Teen thriller films
2020s English-language films
2020s American films